Rodney and Rachel Saunders were British botanists and horticulturalists who established Silverhill Seeds in Cape Town in the 1970s. They collected and studied rare specimens of South African plants such as Gladioli.  They were murdered in 2018 while on an expedition in the oNgoye Forest. They were aged 74 and 63 respectively.

References

External links
The Bulb Garden, Spring 2018 issue. Obituaries and memories of Rod and Rachel Saunders.

2018 deaths
People murdered in South Africa
21st-century British botanists
Horticulturists